Montagnani is a surname. Notable people with the surname include:

Nerina Montagnani (1897–1993), Italian actress
Renzo Montagnani (1930–1997), Italian actor